Nuttin' Less Nuttin' Mo' is the second and final album released by rap group, the College Boyz. It was released on October 4, 1994 through Virgin and Capitol Records. After a successful debut two years prior, this album failed to match the success of Radio Fusion Radio, only peaking at #80 on the Top R&B/Hip-Hop Albums. The only charting single "Rollin" just peaked at #49 on the Hot Rap Singles.

Track listing
"Live on Wzack"- 3:42
"Moment of Truth (The Southern Version)"- 5:20
"Rollin'"- 3:54
"On Da' Stroll"- 4:27
"Easy"- 4:05
"Dyin' Out Here"- 3:44
"If I Wuz a Bird"- 4:05
"No Sets, No Drama, No Stress"- 4:29
"15 Emotions"- 3:34
"Conscious Weep"- 4:53
"Texas Do"- 5:06
"Nuttin' Less, Nuttin' Mo'"- 4:26
"Run Dance Hall"- 3:56
"Dedication"- 4:23

Samples
"Live on Wzack"
"Dr. Funkenstein" by Parliament
"Run Dance Hall"
"Don't Change Your Love" by Five Stairsteps
"No Sets, No Drama, No Stress"
"Float On" by The Floaters
"Emotions"
"I'm Glad You're Mine" by Al Green

Album Chart Awards

Single Chart Awards

Rollin

1994 albums
College Boyz albums
Capitol Records albums
Virgin Records albums